This page documents the tornadoes and tornado outbreaks of 1991, primarily in the United States. Most tornadoes form in the U.S., although some events may take place internationally. Tornado statistics for older years like this often appear significantly lower than modern years due to fewer reports or confirmed tornadoes, however by the 1990s tornado statistics were coming closer to the numbers we see today.

Synopsis

The tornado season of 1991 looks generally very average on paper. The spring months of March, April, May and June all saw very large numbers of tornadoes and tornado outbreaks. The fall, sometimes referred to as a "second season", was very quiet.  The Andover, Kansas outbreak of April 26, 1991 was famous for its violent tornadoes, incredible video and is the signature event of this tornado season. 1991 saw one F5 tornado touch down in Kansas.

Events

Confirmed tornado total for the entire year 1991 in the United States.

January
There were 29 tornadoes confirmed in the US in January.

February
There were 11 tornadoes confirmed in the US in February.

March
There were 157 tornadoes confirmed in the US in March.

March 22
An outbreak produced 23 tornadoes, with six fatalities being confirmed in Kentucky and Tennessee. An 11-year-old boy was killed in Olmstead in Logan County, Kentucky when an F2 tornado picked up a mobile home and slammed it against a tree.

March 26–29
An outbreak produced 50 tornadoes over a two day span. An F4 tornado passed near Hutchinson, Kansas on March 26, while two people were killed by tornadoes in Wisconsin and Indiana on March 27. After only two weak F0 tornadoes touched down on March 28, another outbreak of 21 tornadoes struck the Southeastern United States on March 29. An F1 tornado struck Munford, Alabama, where it destroyed several trailer homes, killing five people, four of them in one family. An F3 tornado moved through Clarkdale, Georgia, destroying 15 townhouses, damaging 120 others, and injuring 25 people. An F2 tornado destroyed 16 homes and heavily damaged 39 others in Ladonia, Alabama, injuring 16 people. In all, 73 tornadoes touched down during the outbreak sequence.

April
There were 204 tornadoes confirmed in the US in April.

April 26 

This violent tornado outbreak of 53 tornadoes took place on April 26, 1991, killing 24 people and injuring hundreds more. The killer Andover tornado was rated F5, while four others were rated F4, including the monstrous Red Rock tornado. At the time, the Red Rock tornado generated the highest wind speeds, detected by mobile doppler radar, until the May 3, 1999, Bridge Creek-Moore F5 tornado. This is also the outbreak from which the infamous video was shot by a news crew hiding under an overpass in Kansas. This early viral video spread the myth that sheltering underneath an overpass was safer during a tornado. The television crew was hit by a F2 tornado.

May

There were 335 tornadoes confirmed in the US in May.

May 10
Three tornadoes formed in Lazbuddie, Texas.

May 15
An outbreak of five tornadoes struck Western and Northwestern Oklahoma. The strongest was an 800–900 yard wide F3 tornado that tracked 11.5 miles near Laverne, injuring three people. The same cell also dropped hail up to the size of grapefruits.

June
There were 216 tornadoes confirmed in the US in June.

June 14 
An F0 tornadic waterspout (starts as a tornado) reported near Lake Okeechobee, Florida created a surreal nighttime sight of a tornado and lightning while only doing minor damage. A famous photo of the event, which includes a mixture of brown and black color of the tornado accompanied with a lightning strike, was taken by Fred Smith, who was photographing the tornado from his backyard.

July
There were 64 tornadoes confirmed in the US in July, including one in Cass County, Minnesota, on July 5, 1991. This particular tornado started as a waterspout, came ashore and destroyed a dock, uprooted trees and overturned a boat. This tornado was also featured on some tornado-themed documentaries.

August
There were 46 tornadoes confirmed in the US in August.

September
There were 26 tornadoes confirmed in the US in September.

October
There were 21 tornadoes confirmed in the US in October.

November
There were 20 tornadoes confirmed in the US in November.

November 29
An F4 tornado tore through areas near Springfield, Missouri, killing two people.

December
There were 3 tornadoes confirmed in the US in December.

See also
 Tornado
 Tornadoes by year
 Tornado records
 Tornado climatology
 Tornado myths
 List of tornado outbreaks
 List of F5 and EF5 tornadoes
 List of North American tornadoes and tornado outbreaks
 List of 21st-century Canadian tornadoes and tornado outbreaks
 List of European tornadoes and tornado outbreaks
 List of tornadoes and tornado outbreaks in Asia
 List of Southern Hemisphere tornadoes and tornado outbreaks
 List of tornadoes striking downtown areas
 Tornado intensity
 Fujita scale
 Enhanced Fujita scale

References

External links
 U.S. tornadoes in 1991 - Tornado History Project
 Tornado deaths monthly

 
1991 meteorology
Tornado-related lists by year
Torn